Johan Lopez Santos (born April 16, 1989 in Rio San Juan) is a male volleyball player from the Dominican Republic, who won the Bronze medal with the men's national team at the 2008 Men's Pan-American Volleyball Cup in Winnipeg, Canada. He plays as a Middle-Blocker and Opposite.

Clubs
 Bameso (2006)
 Avanzada Juvenil (2006)
 29 de Junio (2007)
 Santo Domingo (2007–2008)
 Distrito Nacional (2007-2008)
 Sanchez Ramirez (2010)
 La Romana (2010)
 San Antonio Los Alcarrizos (2011)
 Junk (2011-2012)
 So Ninja (2012-2013)

Awards
Bameso (2006) Champion
Distrito Nacional Men Volleyball Club(2007-2008)Champion
San Antonio Los Alcarrizos (2011) Second
Dominican National Championship(2010)San Francisco de Macoris Champion

References

External links
 Dominican Republic Federation

1989 births
Living people
Dominican Republic men's volleyball players